Peristernia is a genus of sea snails, marine gastropod mollusks in the subfamily Peristerniinae  of the  family Fasciolariidae, the spindle snails, the tulip snails and their allies.

Species
Species within the genus Peristernia include:

 Peristernia aethiops Macpherson, 1959
  † Peristernia allioni (Michelotti, 1847)
 Peristernia angulata (G.B. Sowerby III, 1888)
 Peristernia australiensis (Reeve, 1847)
 Peristernia bicolor (Küster & Kobelt, 1874)
 Peristernia boutetorum Tröndlé, 2017
 Peristernia canthariformis Melvill, 1891
 Peristernia carlajoostae Lussi, 2014
 Peristernia carotiana (Tapparone-Canefri, 1880)
 Peristernia castanoleuca Tapparone-Canefri, 1879
 Peristernia chlorostoma (G.B. Sowerby I, 1825)
 Peristernia clathrata (Valenciennes, 1840)
 Peristernia columbarium (Gmelin, 1791)
 Peristernia cremnochione Melvill, 1891
 Peristernia crocea (Gray, 1839)
 Peristernia decorata (Adams, 1855)
 Peristernia despecta (Adams, 1855)
 Peristernia forskalii (Tapparone-Canefri, 1875)
 Peristernia funiculata (Tapparone-Canefri, 1882)
 Peristernia fuscotincta (G.B. Sowerby III, 1886)
 Peristernia gemmata (Reeve, 1847)
 Peristernia granulosa (Pease, 1868)
 Peristernia hilaris Melvill, 1891
 Peristernia igorshlegeli Bozzetti, 2020
 Peristernia incerta Schepman, 1911
 Peristernia iniuensis Melvill, 1891
 Peristernia jeaniae (Melvill, 1911)
 Peristernia lirata (Pease, 1868)
 Peristernia loebbeckei (Küster & Kobelt, 1876)
 Peristernia malvastoma Lussi, 2014
 Peristernia marquesana (A. Adams, 1855)
 Peristernia melanorhynca (Tapparone-Canefri, 1882)
 Peristernia moltenii Bozzetti, 2014
 Peristernia nassatula (Lamarck, 1822)
 Peristernia neglecta (A. Adams, 1855)
 Peristernia nigritella (Tapparone-Canefri, 1882)
 Peristernia pulchella (Reeve, 1847)
 Peristernia reincarnata Snyder, 2000
 Peristernia retiaria Melvill, 1891
 Peristernia rollandi (Bernardi & Crosse, 1861)
 Peristernia rosea (Reeve, 1846)
 Peristernia scabra (Souverbie, 1869) (taxon inquirendum)
 Peristernia schepmani Dekkers, 2014
 Peristernia smithiana Melvill, 1891
 Peristernia squamosa (Pease, 1863)
 Peristernia striata (Gray, 1839)
 Peristernia sulcata (Gray, 1839)
 Peristernia taitensis (Lesson, 1842)
 Peristernia tayloriana (Reeve, 1848)
 Peristernia tulipa (Lesson, 1841)
 Peristernia ustulata (Reeve, 1847)
 Peristernia venusta Smith, 1911
 Peristernia violacea (Reeve, 1847)

 Species brought into synonymy 
 Peristernia aureocincta Sowerby, 1875: synonym of Latirus aureocinctus G. B. Sowerby III, 1875: synonym of Teralatirus noumeensis (Crosse, 1870): synonym of Crassicantharus noumeensis (Crosse, 1870)
 Peristernia bonasia (Martens, 1880): synonym of Engina bonasia (E. von Martens, 1880)
 Peristernia brazieri Angas, 1877: synonym of Nodopelagia brazieri (Angas, 1877)
 Peristernia corallina Melvill & Standen, 1903 : synonym of Orania corallina (Melvill & Standen, 1903)
 Peristernia deshayesii Küster & Kobelt, 1876 : synonym of Peristernia nassatula var. deshayesii Küster & Kobelt, 1876
 Peristernia fenestrata Gould, 1860 : synonym of Vaughtia fenestrata (Gould, 1860)
 Peristernia fragaria Wood: synonym of Engina fragaria (W. Wood, 1828)
 Peristernia incarnata: synonym of Peristernia reincarnata Snyder, 2000
 Peristernia leucothea Melvill, 1891: synonym of Peristernia forskalii leucothea Melvill, 1891
 Peristernia mannophora Melvill, 1891 : synonym of Latirus mannophorus (Melvill, 1891)
 Peristernia neglecta (Adams, 1855) : synonym of Peristernia pulchella (Reeve, 1847)
 Peristernia nodulosa A. Adams, 1855 : synonym of Attiliosa nodulosa (A. Adams, 1855)
 Peristernia paulucciae Tapparone-Canefri, 1879 : synonym of Engina paulucciae (Tapparone-Canefri, 1879)
 Peristernia philberti (Récluz, 1844): synonym of Latirus philberti (Récluz, 1844)
 Peristernia pilsbryi Kuroda & Habe, 1952 : synonym of Fusolatirus coreanicus (E.A. Smith, 1879)
 Peristernia rubens (Lamarck, 1822): synonym of Benimakia rubens (Lamarck, 1822)
 Peristernia rudolphi Brazier, 1894 : synonym of Litozamia rudolphi (Brazier, 1894)
 Peristernia scabrosa (Reeve, 1847) : synonym of Peristernia chlorostoma (Sowerby, 1825)
 Peristernia sowerbyi (Melvill, 1907): synonym of Benimakia sowerbyi (Melvill, 1907)
 Peristernia strangei (Adams, 1855) : synonym of Latirus strangei (Adams, 1855)
 Peristernia xantochrous (Tapparone-Canefri, 1880): synonym of Latirus xantochrous (Tapparone-Canefri, 1881)
 Peristernia zealandica (Küster & Kobelt, 1876): synonym of Benimakia rubens (Lamarck, 1822)

References

 Snyder M.A. (2003). Four new species of Latirus (Gastropoda: Fasciolariidae) from the Philippine Islands and the southern Caribbean. Iberus 20(3): 1-9
 Martin Avery Snyder and Paul Callomon (2010). Tapparone-Canefri's Type Material of Fasciolariid Gastropoda (Mollusca) at the Genoa Natural History Museum, Proceedings of the Academy of Natural Sciences of Philadelphia 159(1):31-38; 
 Martin Avery Snyder (2000), Nomenclatural emendations in the family Fasciolariidae (Mollusca, Gastropoda), Proceedings of the Academy of natural Sciences of Philadelphia 150, 173-179

External links

Fasciolariidae
Gastropod genera